The 1948 NFL season was the 29th regular season of the National Football League. During the season, Halfback Fred Gehrke painted horns on the Los Angeles Rams' helmets, making the first modern helmet emblem in pro football. The last regular season game played on Wednesday until the 2012 season happened on September 22, 1948, between Detroit and Los Angeles.
The season ended when the Philadelphia Eagles defeated the Chicago Cardinals in the NFL Championship Game.

The 1948 season featured the highest per-game, per-team scoring in NFL history, with the average team scoring 23.2 points per game. This record stood for 65 years until .

Draft
The 1948 NFL Draft was held on December 19, 1947 at Pittsburgh's Fort Pitt Hotel. With the first pick, the Washington Redskins selected halfback Harry Gilmer from the University of Alabama.

Major rule changes
Plastic helmets are prohibited. This rule was enacted because critics argued that they were being used more as a weapon than protection.
A flexible artificial tee is permitted at the kickoff.
When the intended passer is tackled behind the line of scrimmage, the game clock will stop temporarily until any receivers who have gone down field have had a reasonable time to return.
When the offense is called for delay of game, the defense may decline the 5-yard distance penalty.
If a foul occurs behind the line during a backwards pass or fumble, the penalty is enforced from the spot of the pass or fumble.
It is illegal to bat or punch the ball while it is in a player's possession.
All officials are equipped with whistles, not horns.

Division races
In the Eastern race, the Eagles demolished Washington 45–0 in Week Five to take a ½ game lead. When the 6–1–1 Eagles met the 6–2 Skins again in Week Ten, they beat Washington 42–21, and won the Division and the right to host the Championship Game.

The other race was all Chicago: the Cardinals and Bears both had records of 10–1 going into the final week: thus, there was a defacto playoff game for the Western Division for the second year in succession, with a tie forcing a second playoff game the following week.

A record crowd of 51,283 attended Wrigley Field on December 12 for the all-Chicago showdown, with the Bears taking a 21–10 lead on George Gulyanics' touchdown as the fourth quarter began.  Charley Trippi's touchdown cut the margin to 21–17, but the Bears had the ball and time on their side.  The turning point came when the Cards' Vince Banonis picked off a pass from Johnny Lujack, and ran the ball back to the Bears' 19, and Elmer Angsman scored the winning touchdown three plays later for the Western Division title and the trip to the Championship Game.

Final standings

NFL Championship Game
Philadelphia Eagles 7, Chicago Cardinals 0 in a blizzard at Shibe Park, Philadelphia, Pennsylvania, December 19, 1948

League leaders

Awards
 UPI NFL Most Valuable Player – Pat Harder, Chicago Cardinals

Coaching changes
Detroit Lions: Gus Dorais was replaced by Bo McMillin.
Los Angeles Rams: Bob Snyder was replaced by Clark Shaughnessy.
Pittsburgh Steelers: Jock Sutherland was replaced by John Michelosen.

References

 
 Total Football: The Official Encyclopedia of the National Football League

National Football League seasons